Maxim Polunin (born 23 June 1975) is a Kazakhstani ski jumper. He competed in the normal hill and large hill events at the 2002 Winter Olympics.

References

1975 births
Living people
Kazakhstani male ski jumpers
Olympic ski jumpers of Kazakhstan
Ski jumpers at the 2002 Winter Olympics
Sportspeople from Almaty
Asian Games medalists in ski jumping
Ski jumpers at the 2003 Asian Winter Games
Asian Games bronze medalists for Kazakhstan
Medalists at the 2003 Asian Winter Games